Mihail Dudaš (born 1 November 1989) is a Serbian decathlete and heptathlete. He holds national records in both events.

Career
He won a bronze medal at the 2008 World Junior Championship and bronze medals at the U23 European Championship in 2009 and 2011.

His first senior success was achieved at the 2011 World Championship when he finished 6th with a new national record of 8256 points. Next year he competed at the European Outdoor Championship where he came 4th. Dudaš qualified for the 2012 Olympics but couldn't finish decathlon due to migraine. At the 2013 European Indoor Championship he won his first senior medal, bronze in heptathlon and achieved new national record of 6099 points. He improved national record in decathlon at the 2013 World Championship which now stands 8275 points and it brought him 14th place. He missed entire 2014 season due to surgery of Achilles tendon.  He won the bronze medal at the 2016 European Championships.  He qualified for the 2016 Olympic decathlon but again was unable to finish.

Dudaš is ethnic Rusyn.

Statistics

Outdoor

Indoor
.

International competitions

See also
 Serbian records in athletics

References

External links 

 
 
 
 
 

1989 births
Living people
Rusyn people
Serbian decathletes
Serbian people of Rusyn descent
Sportspeople from Novi Sad
Athletes (track and field) at the 2012 Summer Olympics
Athletes (track and field) at the 2016 Summer Olympics
Olympic athletes of Serbia
European Athletics Championships medalists
Pannonian Rusyns